Hockey in Turkey may refer to:

Field hockey
 Turkish Hockey Federation

Ice hockey
 Turkish Ice Hockey Federation
 Turkish Ice Hockey Super League

Other
 Underwater hockey in Turkey